Power Woman may refer to:
 Nele DB
Power Girl, the Earth-Two cousin of Superman in DC Comics
Jessica Jones or Power Woman, the wife of Luke Cage in Marvel Comics